David Shou-Yeh Wong (born c. 1941) is a Hong Kong billionaire banker and philanthropist.

Biography
A native of Ningbo, Zhejiang, China, Wong is the founder and President of the Dah Sing Bank Limited. He also invests in mainland China, including the Chongqing Business Bank.

He is chairman of Dah Sing Life Assurance Company Ltd. as well as vice-president of the Hong Kong Institute of Bankers.

In 2008's Forbes Hong Kong's 40 Richest list, Wong was ranked as one of Hong Kong's top 40 billionaires (No.37).

References

External links
 Forbes: 2008 Hong Kong's 40 Richest
 Biography of David Shou-Yeh Wong

1940s births
Living people
Hong Kong bankers
Hong Kong billionaires
Hong Kong chief executives
Billionaires from Zhejiang
Hong Kong financial businesspeople
Businesspeople from Ningbo